Longano is a comune (municipality) in the Province of Isernia in the Italian region of Molise, located about  west of Campobasso and about  south of Isernia.

Longano borders the following municipalities: Castelpizzuto, Gallo Matese, Isernia, Monteroduni, Pettoranello del Molise, Roccamandolfi, Sant'Agapito.

Demographic evolution

References

Cities and towns in Molise